Chu shogi (  or Middle Shogi) is a strategy board game native to Japan. It is similar to modern shogi (sometimes called Japanese chess) in its rules and gameplay. Its name means "mid-sized shogi", from a time when there were three sizes of shogi variants that were regularly being played. Chu shogi seems to have been developed in the early 14th century as a derivative of dai shogi ('large shogi'). There are earlier references, but it is not clear that they refer to the game as we now know it.

With fewer pieces than dai shogi, the game is considered more exciting, and was still commonly played in Japan in 1928–1939, especially in the Keihanshin region. In 1976, there were about 30–40 masters of the game. It has gained some adherents in the West, having been praised as "the best of all large chess games" by David Pritchard, and still maintains a society (the Chushogi Renmei, or Japanese Chu Shogi Association) and an online following in Japan.

Rules of the game

Objective 

The objective of the game is to capture the opponent's king and, if present, the prince, which counts as a second king. These two pieces are called "royal pieces", as the game is lost when a player is left without any of them. Alternatively, under the rules of the Japanese Chu Shogi Association, it suffices to capture all the opponent's other pieces, leaving a bare king or a bare prince, whereupon the player wins and the game ends early, provided that one's own king is not immediately bared or captured on the next move. Unlike standard shogi, pieces may not be dropped back into play after capture.

Gameplay 

Two players alternate making a move, with Black moving first. (The pieces are not differentiated by color, but rather by facing of the pieces, with the "sharp" end pointed at the opponent; the traditional chess terms "Black" and "White" are only used to indicate who plays first, and to differentiate the sides during discussions of the game.) A move consists of moving a piece either to an empty square on the board or to a square occupied by an opposing piece, thus capturing that piece; and optionally of promoting the moving piece, if the move enters the promotion zone, or if it is a capture and any part of it is in the promotion zone.

Game equipment 
The squares are undifferentiated by marking or color, unlike a Western chess board.

Each player has a set of 46 pieces of 21 different types, and each piece has its name written on it in Japanese kanji. The writing is typically in black. On the reverse side of most pieces (i.e. except the king, queen, and lion) there are characters to indicate the piece's promoted rank, typically written in red. The pieces are wedge-shaped and their orientation indicates which player they belong to, as they point toward the opposing side. In all, the players must remember 28 moves for these pieces. The pieces are of slightly different sizes; from largest to smallest (most to least powerful) they are:

 1 King
 1 Queen (also referred to as a "Free king" in some sources, which is a direct translation of the Japanese name)
 1 Lion
 2 Dragon kings
 2 Dragon horses
 2 Rooks
 2 Bishops
 1 Kirin (sometimes called "Kylin", an anglicisation)
 1 Phoenix
 1 Drunk elephant
 2 Blind tigers
 2 Ferocious leopards
 2 Gold generals
 2 Silver generals
 2 Copper generals
 2 Vertical movers
 2 Side movers
 2 Reverse chariots
 2 Lances
 2 Go-betweens
 12 Pawns

Listed below are the pieces of the game and, if they promote, the pieces they promote to. Names are rough translations that have become somewhat standardized in English. Pieces are listed alphabetically by their English name.

The promotions apply only to pieces that start out with the ranks in the left-most column. That is, pieces with these ranks written in black; promoted pieces with those same ranks written in red may not be promoted further. Pieces that only appear upon promotion, that is, names that only occur written in red, are marked with an asterisk. The king, queen, and lion do not promote.

Below is a diagram showing the setup of the players' pieces.  The board setup is symmetrical: the way one player sees their own pieces is the same way that the opposing player sees their pieces.

In some contexts, one-letter abbreviations may be necessary. Those used in WinBoard are given in the second column of abbreviations.
Promoted pieces are notated by a + in front of the symbol; thus a white horse is +L, and a promoted gold (now a rook) is +G.

Sometimes the kirin is abbreviated Ky (for kylin), and the queen FK (for free king).

Promotion 

The promotion zone is the 'enemy camp', the farthest four ranks of the board, which are mostly occupied by the opposing player's pieces when the board is first set up.  When a promotable piece enters the promotion zone from outside, or makes a capture starting within the promotion zone, it has the option of "promoting" to a more powerful rank. Promotion is not mandatory, and in some cases it may be beneficial to leave the piece unpromoted. (For example, the pawn, gold general, silver general, copper general, ferocious leopard, phoenix, kirin, vertical mover, side mover, and go-between all lose some of their powers upon promoting, so that there may be immediate tactical reasons for deferral, even though they all gain much more than they lose.) Promotion is permanent and promoted pieces may not revert to their original rank, nor promote a second time. If a piece is not promoted upon entering the promotion zone, then it may only promote by making a capture, or by exiting and reentering the zone. Pawns are an exception (see below).

Promotion is effected by turning the piece over after it moves, revealing the name of its promoted rank. Promoting a piece has the effect of changing how that piece moves. See below. For example, promoting a kirin turns it into a lion, and thereafter it behaves exactly like the original lion, even for the lion-trading rules. (Which can be a reason to defer promotion of a kirin.) A rook obtained by promoting a gold differs from an original rook, though, in that the latter can still promote (to dragon king), while the former cannot.

If a pawn reaches the furthest rank, it gets a second opportunity to promote on a non-capture. (This is because the pawn can never leave the zone, and there is a legitimate reason to defer its promotion: a pawn can stand between two protected lions without allowing either player to trade them, which is something a promoted pawn – a gold general – cannot do.) No such exception exists or is needed for lances (the only other piece with no backward moves) as there is never any reason to defer promotion of a lance in the first place: therefore, a lance that reaches the furthest rank without promoting becomes an immobile "dead piece". This last-rank promotion of pawns can likewise be declined, leaving the pawn as an immobile "dead piece". (Unlike for lances, this might still be done with reason, again because of the lion-trading rules.)

According to Okazaki Shimei, the go-between can likewise promote on the furthest rank on a non-capture. In the past, the Japanese Chu Shogi Association used this rule, but later repealed it because the go-between can go backwards. Some of the new rules given by Okazaki and not present in the Edo-period texts seem to be late innovations in the history of chu shogi from the Showa period.

Piece movement 

An opposing piece is captured by displacement: That is, if a piece moves to a square occupied by an opposing piece, the opposing piece is displaced and removed from the board. A piece cannot move to a square occupied by a friendly piece, that is, by another piece controlled by the moving player.

Each piece on the game moves in a characteristic pattern. Pieces move either orthogonally (that is, forward, backward, left, or right, in the direction of one of the arms of a plus sign, +), or diagonally (in the direction of one of the arms of a multiplication sign, ×). The lion is the sole exception, in that it is not required to move in a straight line.

As stated earlier, this game is based on dai shogi and all of the pieces of this game can be found in dai shogi.  The eight types of pieces that were removed were all rather weak and all promoted to gold generals. Furthermore, the larger board of dai shogi makes the slow-moving step movers even slower. All of this made for comparatively dull gameplay.

Many pieces are capable of several kinds of movement, with the type of movement most often depending on the direction in which they move. The movement categories are:

Step movers

Some pieces move only one square at a time. If a friendly piece occupies an adjacent square, the moving piece may not move in that direction; if an opposing piece is there, it may be displaced and captured.

The step movers are the king, prince, drunk elephant, blind tigers, ferocious leopards, the generals, go-betweens, and the 12 pawns of each side. Only the king and prince can move in all eight directions. The king and prince are additionally considered royal pieces, as losing both of them loses the game. The Japanese Chu Shogi Association, in addition to separating out the king and prince, also considers the pawns and go-betweens as a separate class of 'pawns', while the remaining step movers are called 'small pieces'.

Jumping pieces

Several pieces can jump, that is, they can pass over any intervening piece, whether friend or foe, with no effect on either. These are the lion, the kirin, the phoenix, the horned falcon and the soaring eagle. Only the lion can jump in all directions.

Ranging pieces

Many pieces can move any number of empty squares along a straight orthogonal or diagonal line, limited only by the edge of the board. If an opposing piece intervenes, it may be captured by moving to that square and removing it from the board. A ranging piece must stop where it captures, and cannot bypass a piece that is in its way. If a friendly piece intervenes, the moving piece is limited to a distance that stops short of the intervening piece; if the friendly piece is adjacent, it cannot move in that direction at all.

The ranging pieces are the queen, dragon king, dragon horse, rook, bishop, vertical mover, side mover, reverse chariot, lance, and all those pieces which do not appear in the initial setup except the prince. Only the queen can range along all eight directions. The Japanese Chu Shogi Association further divides them into greater and lesser ranging pieces: the greater ranging pieces are the queen, horned falcon, and soaring eagle, and the remainder are lesser ranging pieces.

Lion move (multiple capture)

The lion has a double-capture ability, called a 'lion move', as to a lesser extent do the soaring eagle and horned falcon (promoted dragon king and dragon horse).  The details of these powerful moves are described for the lion below.

Individual pieces

Following are diagrams that indicate the movement of each piece.  Pieces are listed roughly in order, from front to back rows, with pieces making similar moves paired.  Pieces with a grey heading start out in the game; those with a blue heading only appear on the board as a promoted piece. Betza's funny notation has been included in brackets for easier reference, with the extension that the notation xxxayyyK stands for an xxxK move possibly followed by an yyyK move, not necessarily in the same direction. By default continuation legs can go into all directions, but can be restricted to a single line by a modifier 'v' ("vertical", interpreted relative to the piece's current position on its path). The default modality of all legs is the ability to move and capture: other possibilities are specified explicitly. Square brackets are used to make it clear what operators the a modifier chains together: thus DaK would denote a dabbaba move followed by a king move, but D[aK] would denote a piece that can move as a dabbaba, or twice as a king.

The next three pieces have special movements that involve the ability to move and even capture twice per turn.

Lion moves
Below are eight examples of the lion-trading rules in action. In all examples below, the Black and White pieces are distinguished by colour, rather than their direction as they would be in a real game. (Black moves up the board.)

Repetition 

In principle a player may not make a move if the resulting position is one that has previously occurred in the game with the same player to move. (This rule is usually relaxed without altering its effect, by only forbidding the 4th occurrence of any position, to allow for human error.) However, evidence from historical mating problems suggests that this prohibition does not apply to a player who is in check.

Note that certain pieces have the ability to pass in certain situations (a lion, when at least one square immediately adjacent to it is unoccupied, a horned falcon, when the square immediately in front of it is unoccupied, and a soaring eagle, when one or both of the two squares immediately diagonally in front of it are unoccupied). (The lion, horned falcon, and soaring eagle can also be blocked from passing by the edge of the board.) Such a pass move leaves the position unchanged, but it does not violate the repetition rule, as it will now be the turn of the other player to move. Of course, two consecutive passes are not possible, as the first player will see the same position as before.

The Japanese Chu Shogi Association plays by more complex repetition rules. Only a fourth repetition is forbidden, and the burden to deviate is not necessarily on the player that reaches this first. If one side is making attacks on other pieces (however futile) with his moves in the repeat cycle, and the other is not, the attacking side must deviate, while in case of checking the checker must deviate regardless of whether the checked side attacks other pieces. In the case of consecutive passes, the side passing first must deviate, making turn passing to avoid zugzwang pointless if the opponent is in a position where they can pass their turn too. If none of these are applicable, repetition is a draw.

Check and mate 

When a player makes a move such that the opponent's only remaining royal (king or prince) could be captured on the following move, the move is said to give check; the king or prince is said to be in check. If a player's king or prince is in check and no legal move by that player will get it out of check, the checking move is also mate, and effectively wins the game.

Unlike Western chess, a player need not move out of check in chu shogi, and indeed may even move into check. Although obviously not often a good idea, a player with more than one royal may occasionally sacrifice one of these pieces as part of a gambit, or trade it for more capable pieces.

A player is not allowed to give perpetual check. This is not a rule in itself, but arises from the repetition rule.

Game end 

A player who captures the opponent's sole remaining king or prince wins the game. Thus a player who is checkmated or stalemated will lose. The very artificial situation of a smothered stalemate, where no moves are possible (even those that would expose the king), is not covered in the historical sources. The Chess Variant Pages rule this as a loss for the stalemated player, for definiteness.

As an alternative, there is the "bare king" rule.  A historic description of chu shogi mentions, "When pieces are gone, and there are only the 2 kings, one can mate only if he has a promoted gold". Nonetheless, this is only one specific case, and the motivation for such a rule is uncertain given that king and rook (a promoted gold) against king is an easy forced checkmate. The Japanese Chu-Shogi Association has altered this into a general baring rule similar to that of shatranj, where a bare king immediately loses against any other material, unless the player can bare the opponent on the following move (in which case the game is a draw), or the player can capture the opponent's sole remaining king or prince on the following move (in which case the opponent loses). This makes a difference in the endgames of king and pawn against king, or king and ferocious leopard against king, which cannot be won by the stronger side without the bare king rule (and also in some cases with blind tigers, silver generals, and copper generals that can be trapped by the enemy king when separated from their own kings). Further detail is offered in their standardised rules: king and any piece against king is an immediate win by the bare king rule, except if the piece is a pawn or go-between, in which case it must be promoted safely (to a gold general or drunk elephant respectively) before the win can be claimed. Furthermore, "dead pieces" do not count under this rule; a king and an immobile pawn or lance at the far rank against a king is still a draw.

In practice these winning conditions are rarely fulfilled, as a player will resign when checkmated, as otherwise when loss is inevitable.

A player who makes an illegal move loses immediately. (This rule may be relaxed in casual games, and Hodges writing for a Western audience encourages players to do so.) Players can also agree to a draw at any time, or if the game reaches a position such that the winning condition is impossible to fulfill for either player (called  , as in standard shogi). Under the historical rules, this means that no legal series of moves can lead to all of one player's royal pieces being captured; under the Japanese Chu Shogi Association's rules, this additionally means that no legal series of moves can lead to one player being left with only a king, or with no royal pieces. In professional play, drawn games are replayed with opposite colours.

Touch rule

Hodges reports a strict touch rule for chu shogi. Once a piece has been touched, then that piece must be moved. Furthermore, if the piece is also moved to a square, it must remain on that square without exception. (That is, the piece cannot be moved to a different square, even if one's hand does not leave the piece.) Thus, chu shogi's touch rule is more severe than the western chess touch-move rule used in tournament play. Under the rules of the Japanese Chu Shogi Association, if a piece is touched but it cannot move, there is no penalty for the first two times, but the opponent can declare a foul on the third time and result in forfeiture of the game.

Handicaps 

Games between players of disparate strengths are often played with handicaps. In a handicap game, one or more of White's pieces are removed from the setup—in exchange, White may move up a few of their pieces or rearrange them to fill in the gaps and protect the weaker pieces, and White plays first. Lions can also be handicapped by having Black's kirin promoted for a second lion, and, for a third, swapping Black's phoenix for White's kirin and promoting the latter.

The imbalance created by this method of handicapping is not as strong as it is in international chess because material advantage is not as powerful in chu shogi as it is in chess.

Most of the handicaps detailed in the Middle Shogi Manual, in increasing order of size, are as follows:

Copper General
Silver General
Blind Tiger
Ferocious Leopard
Gold General
Side Mover
Vertical Mover
Rook

Two Lions
Two Lions and a Copper General
Two Lions and a Silver General
Two Lions and a Ferocious Leopard
Two Lions and a Gold General
Two Lions and a Side Mover
Two Lions and a Vertical Mover
 
Three Lions
Three Lions and One Piece: Three Lions and a Queen
Three Lions and Two Pieces: Three Lions, a Queen and a Dragon King
Three Lions and Three Pieces: Three Lions, a Queen, a Dragon King and a Rook
Three Lions and Four Pieces: Three Lions, a Queen, a Dragon King, a Rook and a Vertical Mover
Three Lions and Five Pieces: Three Lions, a Queen, a Dragon King, a Rook, a Vertical Mover and a Side Mover

There are two other handicaps detailed in the Manual, of unknown exact size: one is Queen (probably slightly weaker than Two Lions); the other is Queen and Dragon King. Other handicaps may be used, such as Two Kings (where the weaker player begins with the Drunk Elephant promoted).

The relationship between handicaps and differences in rank is not universally agreed upon. Colin Adams' suggestion is as follows:

He also once suggested a grading system going downward from 20 kyū (beginner) to 1 , and then upward from 1 dan to 9 . (That suggestion was from about 2000.)

Game notation 

The method used in English-language texts to express shogi moves was established by George Hodges in 1976 ('TSA notation') in the magazine Shogi. It is derived from the algebraic notation used for chess, but modifications have been made for chu shogi.

A typical example is P-8f.  The first one or two letters represents the piece moved (see setup above, except that Ky "kylin" is used for Kirin and FK "free king" for Queen).  Promoted pieces have a + added in front of the letter, for example +P for a promoted pawn. The designation of the piece is followed by a symbol indicating the type of move: - for an ordinary move or x for a capture.
Next is the designation for the square on which the piece lands. This consists of a number representing the file and a lowercase letter representing the rank, with 1a being the top right corner (as seen from Black's point of view) and 12l being the bottom left corner. (This method of designating squares is based on Japanese convention, which, however, uses Japanese numerals instead of letters.

If a move entitles the player to promote the piece, then a + is added to the end to signify that the promotion was taken, or an = to indicate that it was declined.
For example, Px7d= indicates a pawn capturing on 7d without promoting.

In cases where the above notation would be ambiguous, the designation of the start square is added after the designation for the piece in order to make clear which piece is meant.

For example, a Lion on 8c capturing a piece on 9d by  would be shown as Lnx!9d.

When a piece makes a double capture with 'Lion' powers both captures are shown in the order that they were made. For example, a Lion on 3g, capturing a piece on 3h and then capturing another on 2i, would be represented by Lnx3hx2i.

Moves are commonly numbered as in chess.

WinBoard/XBoard uses non-easternised algebraic notation for the moves, differing mainly from TSA notation by using single-letter piece abbreviations, labeling the board files with the letters a–l from left to right, the board ranks with the numbers 1–12 from bottom to top, and omitting the hyphen separator between piece name and square coordinates. It reverses the names "Black" and "White" to conform to international chess. Thus it becomes White who moves first, and his king starts at f1; the Black king starts at g12. (In the TSA notation, these squares are 7l and 6a respectively.) Double moves are indicated by the same method as in TSA notation (e.g. +Dxf6-g7). , however, has no special notation but is written as the back-and-forth double move it is, while a turn pass is written as -- and not associated with a particular piece. Absence of a promotion + suffix implies deferral. Some WinBoard versions use a more general notation for double moves, writing all legs as individual SAN moves, separating them by commas.

Variations

One modern variant of chu shogi, called Heisei chu shogi, is played on a more open board. Forty percent of the pieces are set aside at setup and held in reserve, and once during the game a player may drop one of these on an empty square adjacent to a friendly piece. Captured pieces do not come back into play, and the rest of the game is played as in regular chu shogi.

The set-aside pieces are the lances, coppers, silvers, side movers, vertical movers, reverse chariots, kirin, and phoenix. As with dropped pieces in standard shogi, the piece may not be dropped on a square from where it cannot move (e.g. a lance in the far rank). If dropped into the promotion zone, the piece may promote immediately or on any subsequent move in the promotion zone.

Strategy

Opening 

The valuable long-range sliders have to be shielded from attack by the enemy's much less-valuable steppers by operating from behind one's own steppers, or they would get quickly lost through fork attacks. As the steppers start on the back rank, they need to be developed before one can engage the opponent. This is usually done by pushing the Pawns one rank forward, creating a passage through the 3rd rank by moving up some of the sliders there, and walk Copper, Silver and Leopard to the 4th rank and beyond through the resulting corridor. One of the Side Movers is usually moved up to 4th rank, so that when a player's own camp empties as a result of launching an attack, the Side Movers prevent entry of the enemy Lion by controlling 3rd and 4th rank.

King castle 

The King is usually protected by hiding it behind a wall on the 2nd rank built from the two Tigers and the Elephant. When standing shoulder to shoulder these pieces protect each other's blind spots, making the defense hold up against a lone Lion. An even stronger castle results from leaving the Golds diagonally protecting the outer-most pieces of the wall, although this has the obvious disadvantage that these Golds then cannot be used for attacking, or protecting the wings of a player's camp from infestation by enemy promoting pieces. There is no hurry in building the castle, as it will take a long time before the opponent can fight their way through all the material that is initially in front of a player's King.

Edges 

The left and right board edge are controlled by the battery formed by Lance and Chariot. Usually little can be achieved here before one somehow acquires a majority by taking out some of the opponent's pieces there from the side. But even if the opponent's edge would be completely annihilated, it will take an impractically long time before one can cash in on that, and promote Lance and Chariot so they can get involved on the real battle, as one would first have to get one's Pawn out of the way by walking it to promotion. So a majority here is more a tie breaker in case the main battle ends undecided than an immediate advantage.

Piece values 
According to the German Chu Shogi Association, the average values of the pieces are:

These average values do not take into account the special status of the king and prince as royal pieces. They have also been normalized so that the pawn is worth 1 point to avoid fractions. Additionally, pieces gain in value if they have a good chance of promotion (particularly for the kirin, which promotes to the most powerful piece in the game).

Wayne Schmittberger adopts a different point of view, claiming that no such point values can be assigned, because most pieces can promote. Instead, he sorts the pieces, while grouping them by approximate value:

lion
queen, (soaring eagle), (horned falcon), dragon king, dragon horse
(flying ox), (free boar)
(dragon king), rook, phoenix*
(dragon horse), bishop, vertical mover, (rook)
kirin*, side mover
(white horse), (whale), (crown prince)**
reverse chariot, lance
(flying stag)
gold, drunk elephant*
(bishop)
(vertical mover), (side mover)
ferocious leopard, blind tiger, silver
(drunk elephant), (tokin), copper
go-between, pawn

*Value varies greatly according to how close it is to promotion

**But if the player has lost his or her king, the crown prince is priceless.

() = promoted and cannot promote further; e.g. "(bishop)" = promoted ferocious leopard

Promoting 

Pieces that can slide forward promote far more easily than steppers or jumpers. As the board thins out their promotion becomes unavoidable, while steppers can almost always be met by an opponent stepper to neutralize it by the time it arrives at the promotion zone. The potential promotion gain of the sliders is thus always an important part of the material balance, but if it makes up too large a part of a player's total strength, they might be overwhelmed before they can develop this potential.

Particularly significant are the phoenix and kirin, which promote to the two most powerful pieces in the game. They are best not used up in tactics, but kept until they get an opportunity to survive a promotion.

See also 
 Dai shogi
 Tenjiku shogi
 Shogi variant

References

External links 
 Chu Shogi at The Chess Variant Pages
 Chu shogi page
 Chu shogi strategy etc.
 Colin Adams' chu shogi website at the Internet Archive
 Colin Adams' chu shogi blog
 German Chu Shogi Association (GCSA)  with many reports and games to replay online
 Japanese Chu-Shogi Association (in Japanese)
 American Chu Shogi Association (ACSA; defunct) at the Internet Archive
 Presentation of chu shogi by Jean-Louis Cazaux
 SDIN Chu Shogi - Play chu shogi in real time vs human players or AI
 Chess Variants Game Courier - Play chu shogi via web page, with email notifications when it is one's move.
 Richard's Play-by-eMail Server - Play chu shogi via web page or email commands to the server, with email notifications when moves have been made in the game.
 81Dojo server - An internet server that offered live (as opposed to turn-based) chu shogi with English interface. Chu shogi server not currently functioning.
 HaChu AI by H. G. Muller - Play chu shogi (or a few other variants) against one's own computer
 Chu Shogi, the ancient super Chess game (by H. G. Muller)
 The Chu Shogi promotion rule (by H. G. Muller, referring to historical mating problems)
 Errata to the Middle Shogi Manual's given solutions to the historical mating problems, by H. G. Muller: series A, B, C
 Introduction to Chu Shogi and other variants by Hidetchi (Tomohide Kawasaki) on YouTube
 I-tsu-tsu Blog: An Interview with the President of Japan Chu Shogi Association

Shogi variants